Ayo Rock Formations are monolithic rock boulders located on the island of Aruba in the Caribbean. They are located near Ayo village, about 3.2 km from the natural bridge towards Casibari. Casibari Boulders are about 3.2 km inland between Natural Bridge (now defunct) and Oranjestad, the capital of Aruba, west of Boca Andicuri.

History

The Arawak people were the earliest settlers on the island. They used to visit Ayo Rock Formations so that they could hear incoming thunderstorms closing in on the island of Aruba. They also carved paintings in rocks called petroglyphs while performing religious rites.

Formations

One of the unusual and notable rock formations is the Casibari Boulders, which are tonalite rocks seen to the north of Hooiberg. They are reddish brown in colour and rise above the desert landscape giving a panoramic view of the island. They are located amidst cacti, and lizards are commonly encountered here. The boulders have unusual shapes resembling birds and dragons. There is no plausible explanation yet for the presence of these unusual wind-carved boulder formations on a flat sandy island. However, the geological formations seen on the island are of volcanic origin in its eastern sector, and some areas which are of coral formation are ascribed to the sea which was at higher level. However, in the diorite rock formation region, the Ayo Rock Formations are seen in a heap of monolithic boulders.

Walking trails
Walking trails and steps have been set around the formation. They pass through several narrow tunnel which make the access through a single line quite difficult. Casibari formations are approached 3.2 km from the Highway 4A/B. At the entrance, there is a formation named Dragon Mouth. On a clear day, the entire island and even Venezuela coast line can be seen from the formations site.

References

External links
 Ayo Rock Formations – aruba.com

Landforms of Aruba
Tourist attractions in Aruba
Rock formations